Receptor-type tyrosine-protein phosphatase S, also known as R-PTP-S, R-PTP-sigma, or PTPσ, is an enzyme that in humans is encoded by the PTPRS gene.

Function 

The protein encoded by this gene is a member of the protein tyrosine phosphatase (PTP) family. PTPs are known to be signaling molecules that regulate a variety of cellular processes including cell growth, differentiation, mitotic cycle, and oncogenic transformation. This PTP contains an extracellular region, a single transmembrane segment and two tandem intracytoplasmic catalytic domains (D1 and D2), and thus represents a receptor-type PTP. D1 is catalytically active, while D2 is catalytically inactive. The extracellular region of this protein is composed of multiple Ig-like and fibronectin type III-like domains. Rem2 signaling affects neuronal structure and function in part by regulation of gene expression. Molecular and Cellular NeuroscienceStudies of the similar gene in mice suggested that this PTP may be involved in cell-cell interaction, primary axonogenesis, and axon guidance during embryogenesis. This PTP has been also implicated in the molecular control of adult nerve repair. Four alternatively spliced transcript variants, which encode distinct proteins, have been reported.

Clinical significance 

A PTPRS protein mimetic may improve muscular and bladder control in rats with spinal cord injuries.

Interactions 

PTPRS has been shown to interact with:
 chondroitin sulphate proteoglycans,
 PTPRD, glial-derived  and
 liprin-alpha-1.
 NME2.

References

Further reading